Canal Priests of Mars is a 1990 role-playing game adventure for Space: 1889 published by Game Designers' Workshop.

Plot summary
Canal Priests of Mars is an adventure in which the player characters must travel to Mars on a security job.

Publication history
Canal Priests of Mars was written by Marcus L. Rowland, with a cover by Dell Harris, and illustrations by Rick Harris and Larry MacDougall, and was published by Game Designers' Workshop in 1990 as a 64-page book.

Reception
Games International magazine reviewed Canal Priests of Mars and stated that "distinguished by some excellent non player characters. There is also plenty of detail on ether flyers, floorplans of martian buildings and so on."

References

Role-playing game supplements introduced in 1990
Science fiction role-playing game adventures
Space: 1889